The 2006 UMass Minutemen football team represented the University of Massachusetts Amherst in the 2006 NCAA Division I FCS football season as a member of the Atlantic 10 Conference.  The team was coached by Don Brown and played its home games at Warren McGuirk Alumni Stadium in Hadley, Massachusetts.  The Minutemen won their first conference title since 2003, and advanced all the way to the NCAA Division I Championship before falling to Appalachian State.  2006 was the last season of A-10 football, as all member programs would move over to the Colonial Athletic Association in the offseason.  UMass finished the season with a record of 13–2 (8–0 A-10).

Schedule

References

Further reading

External links
 UMass National Finalists

UMass
UMass Minutemen football seasons
Atlantic 10 Conference football champion seasons
UMass Minutemen football